Events in the year 1925 in Portugal.

Incumbents
President: Manuel Teixeira Gomes
Prime Ministers: Four different

Events
The Democratic Leftwing Republican Party founded
8 November – Portuguese legislative election, 1925.
11 December – Bernardino Machado takes over as President
Establishment of the Union of Economic Interests political party.

Arts and entertainment

Sports
 28 June - 1925 Campeonato de Portugal Final, in Viana do Castelo, between Porto and Sporting CP, won by Porto
 9 September - The Leiria Football Association established.
CF Andorinha founded
SC Maria da Fonte founded

Births

Deaths

5 May – Tomé de Barros Queirós, trader and politician (born 1872)

References

 
1920s in Portugal
Years of the 20th century in Portugal
Portugal